P. spicata may refer to:
 Philotheca spicata, the pepper and salt, a shrub species
 Pimelea spicata, the pink pimelea, an endangered plant species native to New South Wales, Australia
 Polycarpaea spicata, a plant species endemic to Yemen
 Pseudoroegnaria spicata, the bluebunch wheatgrass, a plant species

See also
 Spicata (disambiguation)